Acción (Spanish "action" or "share") or Accion may refer to:

 Acción Emprendedora, a non-profit organization based in Chile
 Accion International, a microfinance organization based in Boston
 Accion USA, the US branch of Accion International
 Accion Lacus, ancient name of Lake Geneva
 Acción mutante, 1993 Spanish science fiction black comedy film 
 Acción, Spanish record label of Pablo Guerrero and other artists
 Accion (TV series), a 2003 American Spanish-language television series

See also
 Acción Popular (disambiguation)
 Acción y reacción
 Action (disambiguation)